Avril Benoît is the executive director of Doctors Without Borders/Médecins Sans Frontières in the United States (MSF-USA) (as of June 2019). Previously, Ms. Benoît served as Director of Communications and Fundraising with Médecins Sans Frontières (MSF) / Doctors Without Borders at its operational centre based in Geneva, Switzerland. She is a Canadian former broadcaster best known for her radio programmes and documentaries on the Canadian Broadcasting Corporation. From 2006 to 2012, after two decades in journalism, she joined MSF in Canada as director of communications. She has worked as a humanitarian country director and project coordinator with Médecins Sans Frontières, in Mauritania, South Sudan, Democratic Republic of Congo and South Africa.

Benoît's documentaries from Kenya, Burundi, India and Brazil aired on CBC Radio One's flagship show, The Current. Her hour-long television documentary Slum Cities: a Shifting World aired on CBC News: Correspondent   on CBC Newsworld. In 2004-2005 she was a Southam Journalism Fellow at Massey College, University of Toronto. Her graduate research focussed on human rights, global governance and official development assistance.

From 1999 to 2004, Benoît hosted and produced Here and Now, CBC Radio One's newsmagazine weekday afternoons on CBLA-FM in Toronto. She co-hosted, with Michael Enright, CBC Radio One's former flagship show This Morning from 1997 to 1999. Before that she hosted an open-line show on CJAD in Montreal and was a political commentator. Benoît anchored numerous breaking news programmes and election night specials.

Benoît's journalistic career included stints as a reporter, writer and host with CBC-TV; a reporter with CBC Radio in Ottawa, Montreal and Quebec City; and a news anchor with the Canadian Forces Network in Germany. Her print background includes covering the 1990 presidential elections in Haiti for The Globe and Mail, and editing The Record daily newspaper in Sherbrooke.

Benoît is a bilingual native of Ottawa, Ontario and Mont-Tremblant, Quebec.

She is the niece of former Ottawa Mayor Pierre Benoit.

References

External links
 Médecins Sans Frontières / Doctors Without Borders Canada 
 Avril Benoît's article about refugees in South Sudan 
 Avril Benoît's article in Policy Options 
 Avril Benoît's TV documentary entitled Slum Cities: A Shifting World 

Living people
Year of birth missing (living people)
People from Laurentides
People from Ottawa
People from Toronto
People from Montreal
Canadian talk radio hosts
CBC Radio hosts
Franco-Ontarian people
Canadian women radio journalists
Canadian women radio hosts